Cecil Vernon Harris (1 September 1896 – 1976) was an English professional footballer who played as a full-back.

References

1896 births
1976 deaths
People from Grantham
English footballers
Association football fullbacks
Grantham Town F.C. players
Llandrindod Wells A.F.C. players
Aston Villa F.C. players
Grimsby Town F.C. players
Gainsborough Trinity F.C. players
English Football League players